Seven ships of the Royal Navy have been named HMS Liverpool after the city of Liverpool, whilst another was planned:

 was a 44-gun fifth-rate frigate, built as HMS Enterprise but renamed before being launched in 1741. She was sold in 1756 and became a privateer.  She was reacquired by the Navy in 1759 and entered service as the 30-gun . She was sold in 1763.
 was a 28-gun sixth-rate frigate launched in 1758 and wrecked in 1778.
 was a 50-gun frigate, later reclassified as a fourth-rate ship of the line, launched in 1814 and sold in 1822.
HMS Liverpool was to have been a 58-gun fourth-rate  frigate, ordered in 1825 and cancelled in 1829.
 was a fourth-rate screw frigate launched in 1860 and sold in 1875.
 was a  light cruiser launched in 1909 and scrapped in 1921.
 was a later  light cruiser launched in 1938 and scrapped in 1958.
 was a Type 42 destroyer launched in 1980 and deployed to the Persian Gulf during the Iraq War (Operation Telic).

Liverpool was also the former name of the ship-of-the line , which was taken into the Royal Navy in 1836 as a gift from the Imaum of Muscat to the British crown; however the name Liverpool was not used in the Royal Navy for this ship.

Battle honours
Ships named Liverpool have earned the following battle honours:
Heligoland, 1914
Mediterranean, 1940
Calabria, 1940
Arctic, 1942
Malta Convoys, 1942

References

Royal Navy ship names